The  is a DC electric multiple unit (EMU) commuter train type introduced in 1979 by Japanese National Railways (JNR). It has been operated by West Japan Railway Company (JR-West) since 1987, and was formerly operated by East Japan Railway Company (JR East) from 1987 until 20 June 2011.

It was the first JNR train to use electronic chopper control.

Operations
The 201 series stock has been used on a large number of lines.

JR-West
 Kansai Main Line (Yamatoji Line), Sakurai Line (Manyo Mahoroba Line), Wakayama Line (from 2006 to 2023 [plan])
 Osaka Higashi Line (from 2008 to 2023 [plan])

Former operations

JR-West
 Tokaido Main Line, Sanyo Main Line (Biwako Line, JR Kyoto Line, JR Kobe Line) (Kusatsu -  Kakogawa) (from 1983 to 2007)
 Kosei Line (from 1997 to 2007, 2018 [test runs])
 Fukuchiyama Line (JR Takarazuka Line) (from 1997 to 2007)
 Osaka Loop Line (from 2005 to 7 June 2019)
 Sakurajima Line (JR Yumesaki Line) (from 2005 to 2019)

JR East
 Chūō Rapid Line (10-cars) (from 1979 to October 2010)
 Chūō-Sōbu Line (10 cars) (from 1982 to 2001)
 Ōme Line (4 cars) (from 1999 to 2008)
 Itsukaichi Line (6 cars) (from 1999 to 2008)
 Hachikō Line (6+4 cars)(Hachiōji - Komagawa, until March 2008)
 Keiyō Line, Sotobō Line, Tōgane Line (10 cars) (from 2000 to 20 June 2011)
 Musashino Line (6 cars) (from 3 March 1986 to November 1996)

Shikisai train
A 4-car 201 series set (W1) was modified in 2001 by JR East to become the special  tourist train, entering service on the Ōme Line from 4 August 2001. This train featured panorama windows and transverse seating bays on one side of the train only. It was repainted into a new livery in June 2005. The train was withdrawn from regular service at the end of June 2009, with a number of special finale runs scheduled for July.

Preserved examples
KuHa 201-1: preserved at Toyoda Depot

Accidents
The accident resulted in 78 injuries but no recorded deaths. The main cause of this accident was about the shunting or decoupling of the two 201 series trainsets which was composed of 4 cars for Ome Line & 6 cars for Chuo Line Rapid, the 4-car set remained in Otsuki, while the 6-car set was leaving from the station for turnover, but unfortunately, there was a delayed Super Azusa train which was coming behind to the main line, resulting in collision.

After this incident, the management of JR East decided to abolish the shunting work that is required the existing ATS to be turned off, and they completely repaired the damanged trainset to let them back from service.

References

External links

 

Electric multiple units of Japan
East Japan Railway Company
West Japan Railway Company
Train-related introductions in 1979
Hitachi multiple units
Kawasaki multiple units
1500 V DC multiple units of Japan
Nippon Sharyo multiple units
Kinki Sharyo multiple units
Tokyu Car multiple units